Sir John Scott (b c 1564 d. 24 September 1616) was an English soldier and politician, and Member of Parliament (MP).

Early life
He was the second son of Sir Thomas Scott, born around the year 1564. His family homes were Scot's Hall and Nettlestead Place in Kent

Career
He served as captain of a band of lancers in the English army in the Netherlands, and in 1588 was knighted for his services. In 1597 he commanded a ship in the expedition to the Azores. 

In 1601, Scott was implicated in Essex's Rebellion but succeeded in clearing himself, and in the same year was a parliamentary candidate for Kent in 1601. He was unsuccessful on this first attempt, but was elected its MP in the Parliament of 1604 and for Maidstone in the Addled Parliament of 1614. 

In November 1603 Anne of Denmark appointed him as one of the advisors for the administration of her English jointure lands. Scott was an early investor in the Colony of Virginia. He became a member of the Council for Virginia in 1607, the year when that colony was re-established, subscribing £75, and was a councillor of the Virginia Company of London in 1609. 

He died in 1616 and was buried at Brabourne in Kent.

Marriages
Scott married twice, but had no issue:
Firstly, in 1590, to Elizabeth Stafford (d. 6 February 1599), widow of Sir William Drury (30 May 1550 – 18 January 1590) of Hawstead, Suffolk, and daughter of Sir William Stafford (d. May 1556) by his wife, Dorothy Stafford (1 October 1526 – 22 September 1604), granddaughter of Edward Stafford, 3rd Duke of Buckingham. By his first marriage, Scott was the stepfather of Sir Robert Drury, friend of the poet, John Donne. Without issue.
Secondly, before 17 September 1599, he married Katherine Smythe, widow of Sir Rowland Hayward, Lord Mayor of London, and daughter of Thomas Smythe (d.1591). She was baptised Katherine Smith on 6 Dec 1561 at All Hallows Lombard Street, City of London and is recorded in the Smythe pedigree taken during the Heraldic Visitation of London in 1568 and the Visitation of Kent in 1619 as the daughter of Thomas Smythe and Alice Judde. Without issue.

Notes

References

 J. E. Neale, The Elizabethan House of Commons (London: Jonathan Cape, 1949)

External links
 Stafford, Elizabeth, in Emerson, Kate, A Who's Who of Tudor Women
Letter from Anne of Denmark, Wilton 12 November 1603, appointing John Scott as an administrator of her jointure estate. British Library

1616 deaths
English MPs 1604–1611
English MPs 1614
English knights
16th-century English soldiers
People from Smeeth